Suzane Louise von Richthofen (born 3 November 1983) is a Brazilian woman who was convicted of murdering her parents on 31 October 2002 with the help of her boyfriend and his brother. She was put on trial in São Paulo in July 2006 and was sentenced to 39 years and 6 months in prison. In 2023 she was released from prison on parole.

Life
Suzane von Richthofen is the daughter of German engineer Manfred Albert von Richthofen and Brazilian psychiatrist Marisia von Richthofen (née Abdalla, of Lebanese descent by paternal side and Portuguese and Italian descent by maternal side) and allegedly a distant relative of the German World War I flying ace Manfred von Richthofen. She is of German, Lebanese, Portuguese and Italian ancestry. Her father was a director of DERSA, a state-owned company which manages São Paulo's highway system, and the chief engineer for the Mário Covas beltway project. She has a younger brother, Andreas Albert von Richthofen. After graduating from a German high school, she studied law at the Pontifical Catholic University of São Paulo. In the summer of 1999, she met Daniel Cravinhos de Paula e Silva, who had been instructing her brother in flying model airplanes. Soon after, they began a relationship and took part in activities together, including attending a Brazilian jiu-jitsu class. 

Suzane's family had a R$ 5.5 million declared net worth. However, prosecutors suspect that two anonymous accounts in Swiss banks, containing at least € 10 million, were opened by Suzane's father in her name in November 2001, when she turned 18. Suzane's father is thought to have embezzled this money from DERSA. Nothing prevents Suzane from gaining access to the money after serving her sentence.

Murder
In the late hours of Thursday, a Halloween of 2002, Suzane von Richthofen, who had planned the murder of her parents for months, checked if they were already asleep, then disconnected the alarm system of the estate and opened the door to her boyfriend, Daniel Cravinhos (21), and his brother, Christian Cravinhos (26), who had been waiting outside. The Cravinhos brothers went upstairs to the parents' bedroom and struck them with iron bars before strangling them with towels. Suzane was waiting in the living room downstairs. After the murder was accomplished, the three staged a break-in by pocketing money they found, spreading papers in the library, and creating a mess in the house. Suzane and Daniel then went to a love hotel, while Christian ate at a fast food restaurant. Early in the morning, Suzane and Daniel picked up her little brother, Andreas, at an internet cafe and went home, where they "discovered" the crime scene, called the police, and told them their story. 

However, investigating officers had doubts that the crime was a burglary and suspected that the perpetrators were known to the victims; they soon began to question the children and the employees of the Richthofen family. Police were suspicious of not only the crime scene, with the alarm system switched off and the papers spread very regularly, as if by design, but also Suzane's cold behaviour – she was seen in the house's swimming pool with Daniel the day after the murder, and celebrated her 19th birthday with friends just hours after the parents' burial. The investigators began shadowing Suzane and Daniel. They also learned that Christian had bought a motorcycle a few days after the murders and had paid cash in R$100 bills, well above his normal income levels. A few days later, on November 9, 2002, he, Daniel and Suzane were all arrested; Suzane soon confessed to the murder. 

Suzane was released from prison in May 2005, when the Supreme Federal Court granted her habeas corpus. She then awaited her trial under house arrest.

Motives
Suzane's parents, who initially allowed her to date Daniel, changed their opinion when they discovered that he used marijuana almost daily, was unwilling to work or attend school, and came from a lower-class background. In July 2002, while Suzane's parents were on vacation, Daniel moved into the house for a month. When the parents came back home, Suzane suggested they buy her a flat in which she could live with Daniel. Her father refused, saying that she could do whatever she liked only if she earned money herself. She continued meeting Daniel secretly. Suzane claimed that her actions were motivated by love, and a fear that Daniel would leave her if the parents were not killed. Her lawyer, Denivaldo Barni, said that Suzane had no motive at all, but was forced to the crime by Daniel, whom she adored like a god.

Another part of the motive may have been the parents' wealth, estimated at about $ 17 million, which Suzane would inherit in the event of the parents' death. As Prosecutor Roberto Tardelli put it, Suzane wanted to "get her hands on the money and assets her parents had worked so hard to obtain"; she "wanted her freedom and independence without having to work for it". On trial, Cravinhos claimed that Suzane was abused by her father, which she and her brother Andreas von Richthofen deny. It was also claimed that the Richthofen parents were alcoholics, but in the autopsy no alcohol was detected in their bodies.

In 2018, a justice denied request of freedom for von Richthofen, citing her egocentrism and a narcissistic personality disorder as serious personality traits that may have led to her crime.

Trial
On 5 June 2006, Suzane von Richthofen, along with the Cravinhos brothers, was put on trial in São Paulo for homicídio qualificado, the equivalent of first degree murder in Brazilian law. The trial was delayed and finally started on 17 July. On trial, Suzane blamed Daniel Cravinhos for everything, while the Cravinhos brothers claimed that they acted on her wishes. Prosecutor Roberto Tardelli, however, called Suzane the "mastermind" of the crime. Roberto Tardelli called for 50 years imprisonment for each of the three defendants. Suzane was described as a "personification of the evil blonde". On 22 July 2006, Suzane was sentenced to 40 years in prison. Daniel Cravinhos got the same sentence and his brother Christian was sentenced to 38 years for conspiracy.
 
She stayed in custody for 16 years in the Penitenciária Feminina Santa Maria Eufrásia Pelletier in Tremembé, state of São Paulo, and was released on probation on 11 January 2023. She currently lives as a recluse in rural Angatuba, a city where her ex-boyfriend's relatives live. In February of the same year, Suzane sparked outrage and media attention when she announced on social media that she made an online store and she began to sell her shopping in Brazil.

In popular culture
The book Richthofen: O assassinato dos pais de Suzane (Richthofen: The murder of Suzane's parents), by Roger Franchini, was published in 2011. The work describes the murder and the subsequent events.

The book Suzane - Assassina e manipuladora (Suzane - Murderer and manipulator), by Ullisses Campbell, was published in 2020. This book is more focused in the life of Suzane von Richthofen and her psychological profile.

The 2021 Brazilian films The Girl Who Killed Her Parents and The Boy Who Killed My Parents are two different depictions of the crime. Brazilian actress Carla Diaz portrays Suzane von Richthofen in both films.

The 2022 Brazilian film A menina que matou os pais: A confissão is the continuation of the 2021 films. It depicts the investigation, confession and trial of the perpetrators.

References

Brazilian people of German descent
Brazilian people of Lebanese descent
Brazilian female murderers
Suzane
1983 births
Living people
Brazilian practitioners of Brazilian jiu-jitsu
Female Brazilian jiu-jitsu practitioners
Brazilian people convicted of murder
People convicted of murder by Brazil
Sportspeople from São Paulo
2002 in Brazil
2002 murders in Brazil
People with narcissistic personality disorder
Parricides